= Jiangxi Ganyue Expressway =

Chinese road maintenance company

- Industry: Road construction
- Headquarters: China
- Website: www.jxexpressway.com

Jiangxi Ganyue Expressway (Simplified Chinese: 江西赣粤高速公路股份有限公司; traditional Chinese: 江西贛粵高速公路股份有限公司; pinyin: Jiangxi Gan-Yue gāosùgōnglù gǔfèn yǒuxiàngōngsī; literally: "Anonymous Motorway Company of Guangdong - Jiangxi") is a Chinese company specializing in the construction, operation and maintenance of motorways.

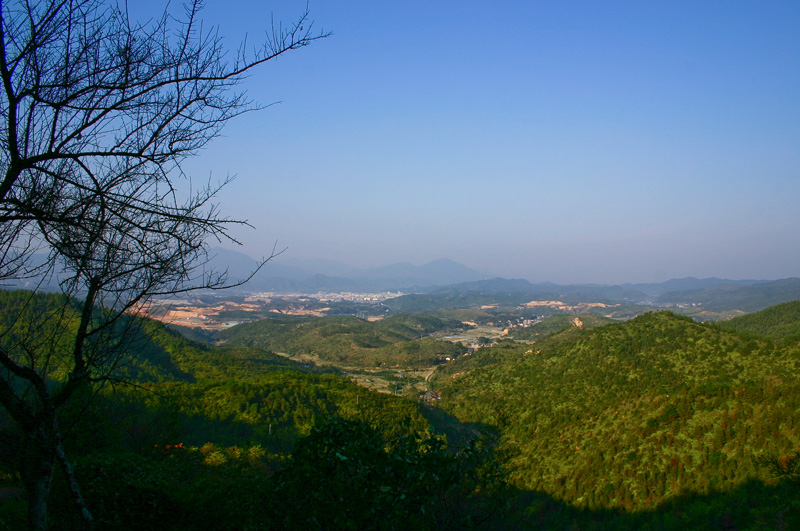
Boundary of Guangdong and Jiangxi provinces.
